"Don't Mess with the Radio" is a song by American singer Nivea from her debut self-titled studio album  (2001). It was written by Cedric Barnett, Marqueze Etheridge, Jamahr Williams, Brandon Bennett and Organized Noize members Ray Murray, Rico Wade, and Sleepy Brown, while production was helmed by Organized Noize and Swift C. It was selected as Nivea's solo debut single.

The song was released on June 12, 2001. While not a major hit in the United States or most other countries, it was a top-twenty success in Australia, reaching number 14 on the ARIA Singles Chart. In April 2002, the song was released in the United Kingdom as a double A-side with "Run Away (I Wanna Be with U)", peaking at number 48 on the UK Singles Chart.

Track listings

Notes
  denotes additional producer

Charts

Weekly charts

Year-end charts

Certifications

Release history

References

2001 debut singles
2001 songs
Jive Records singles
Music videos directed by Chris Robinson (director)
Nivea (singer) songs
Songs about radio
Song recordings produced by Organized Noize
Songs written by Sleepy Brown